El-Arz (also spelled Al-Arz or Ariz) (Arabic: الأرز) is a municipality in the Bsharri District of Lebanon.

References

Populated places in the North Governorate
Bsharri District